Grander may refer to:
John Grander,  Austrian pseudoscientist and inventor
Grander Musashi,  Japanese manga series
A. Grander VIII, a character from The Last American Vampire action horror novel